Bielke is the name of an ancient and powerful Swedish noble family, originally from Småland.

History 
The family was wirst mentioned in the 13th century. It is the second-oldest such family still in existence after Natt och Dag. The comital family branch, descended from the first Count Nils Bielke af Åkerö (1644–1716), is still extant, while the baronial branch became extinct in the male line with the death of Johan Ture Bielke in 1792.

Members of the family include:

Ture Turesson (Bielke) (1425–1489/1490), Swedish Privy Councillor, Lord High Constable
Erik Turesson (Bielke) (d. 1511), Swedish Privy Councillor, Castellan of Vyborg Castle
Anna Eriksdotter (Bielke) (1490–1525), Swedish noblewoman and acting castellan of Kalmar Castle, daughter of Erik Turesson
Gunilla Bielke (1568–1597), Queen of Sweden, consort of King John III of Sweden
Nils Bielke (1644–1716), Swedish Count, German Reichsgraf of Torgelow, Field Marshal and Governor-General of Pomerania
Carl Gustaf Bielke (1683–1754), Count and book collector, Governor of Västernorrland County
Sten Carl Bielke (1709–1753), Baron, judge and botanist, co-founder of the Royal Swedish Academy of Sciences
Nils Adam Bielke (1724–1792), Count, Privy Councillor and Marshal of the Realm
Johan Ture Bielke (1742–1792), Baron, son of Sten Carl Bielke, co-conspirator in the murder of King Gustav III of Sweden
Nils Bielke (1792–1845), Count and courtier, Gentleman of the Bedchamber for the King of Sweden

See also 
René Bielke (b. 1962), German ice hockey player
Don Bielke, American basketball player
Finn Bjelke (1959-), Norwegian humourist, writer, music journalist and radio host.

Notes 

Swedish noble families